Antonino Gallo (born 5 January 2000) is an Italian professional footballer who plays as a defender for  club Lecce.

Club career
Gallo was raised in the youth system of Palermo and started playing for their Under-19 squad in the 2016–17 season. He was called up to the senior squad on several occasions in the 2017–18 and 2018–19 seasons, but did not see time on the field. In the summer of 2019, Palermo went bankrupt, making Gallo a free agent.

On 25 July 2019, he signed with Serie A club Lecce. In the first part of the 2019–20 season, he was included in the matchday squad regularly, but did not make any appearances.

On 21 January 2020, he joined Serie C club Virtus Francavilla on loan. He made his professional Serie C debut for Virtus Francavilla on 26 January 2020 in a game against Paganese. He substituted Matteo Calcagno in the 61st minute. On 9 February 2020, he made his first start against Avellino.

On 24 January 2021, he made his Serie B debut with Lecce in a game against Empoli. One year later, on 23 January 2022, he scored his first professional goal in a home game against Cremonese.

Personal life 
In August 2022, Gallo had his first son with his partner Stephanie, daughter of former Lecce and Palermo player Guillermo Giacomazzi.

Career statistics

References

External links
 

Living people
2000 births
Italian footballers
Footballers from Palermo
Association football defenders
Palermo F.C. players
U.S. Lecce players
Virtus Francavilla Calcio players
Serie A players
Serie B players
Serie C players